Yanbodu Town is an urban town in Cili County, Hunan Province, People's Republic of China.

Administrative division
The town is divided into 26 villages and 1 community:

- Yanbodu Community: 岩泊渡社区

- Hangxi Village: 行溪村

- Liaojia Village: 廖家村

- Shuangqiao Village: 双桥村

- Da'an Village: 大安村

- Yamao Village: 鸭毛村

- Shuangxi Village: 双溪村

- Yangu Village: 岩谷村

- Wanjia Village: 万家村

- Tianping Village: 田坪村

- Gongshi Village: 贡市村 

- Sanwan Village: 三湾村

- Shima Village: 失马村

- Hongyan Village: 红岩村

- Magongdu Village: 马公渡村

- Heping Village:和平村

- Wuyin Village: 五音村

- Liangshan Village: 两山村

- Shiyan Village: 狮岩村

- Baiyangdang Village: 白洋档村

- Shuangge Village: 双鸽村

- Longtan Village: 龙潭村

- Jizhong Village: 集中村

- Tianyu Village: 田峪村

- Hongtu Village: 红土村 

- Xingming Village: 星明村

- Yanshi Village: 岩市村

References

Divisions of Cili County